LORAN-C transmitter Kargaburun is the Yankee secondary station of the Mediterranean Sea LORAN-C Chain (GRI 7990).
It uses a transmission power of 165 kW. Kargaburun LORAN-C transmitter is situated at Kargaburun in Marmara Ereğlisi district of Tekirdağ Province, Turkey at 40°58'21" N, 27°52'2" E,. ("Kargaburun" is Turkish for "crow's nose" or "pliers")

It was later replaced by a tower of same height. Currently, the facility is shut down. The mast has been demolished.

External links
Tech-service.net

LORAN-C transmitters
Towers in Turkey
Marmara Ereğlisi District
Collapsed buildings and structures
Buildings and structures in Tekirdağ Province